Moses Gunn (October 2, 1929 – December 16, 1993) was an American actor of stage and screen. An Obie Award-winning stage player, he is an alumnus of the Negro Ensemble Company. His 1962 off-Broadway debut was in Jean Genet's The Blacks, and his Broadway debut was in A Hand is on the Gate, an evening of African-American poetry. He was nominated for the 1976 Tony Award for Best Actor in a Play for his performance in The Poison Tree, and he also played Othello on Broadway in 1970. For his screen performances, Gunn is best known for his roles as Clotho in WUSA (1970), Bumpy Jonas in Shaft (1971) and Joe on Little House on the Prairie (1977-1981).

Early life, family and education

Gunn was born in St. Louis, Missouri. He was the son of Mary and George Gunn, a laborer, and was one of seven siblings. After his mother died, his family separated. Moses left home and rode the railroad at just 12 years old. He returned to St. Louis and attended school while living at the home of Jewel Richie, his English teacher.

He graduated from Tennessee State University, where he became a member of Omega Psi Phi fraternity Rho Psi chapter. After serving in the United States Army, he attended graduate school at the University of Kansas, earning a master's degree. He taught briefly at Grambling College before attempting an acting career in New York City.

Career
A character actor of film and television, Gunn also enjoyed a successful career on stage. He made his New York City stage debut in the original off-Broadway production of Jean Genet's The Blacks (1962). He performed many Shakespearean roles in Joseph Papp's Shakespeare in the Park, winning an Obie Award for his portrayal of Aaron in Titus Andronicus.

Gunn won a second Obie for his work in the NEC produced First Breeze of Summer, which moved to Broadway. His acclaimed performance as Othello at the Stratford, Connecticut Shakespeare Festival moved to Broadway in 1970.

Other Broadway plays in which Gunn performed were: A Hand is on the Gate, Twelfth Night, I Have a Dream, and The Poison Tree. He received a 1976 Tony Award nomination for Best Actor for The Poison Tree.

In 1991, he toured in a production of Athol Fugard's "My Children! My Africa!" the role of Mr. M, which included a run at Baltimore's Center Stage Theater.

He may be best remembered in film for his portrayal of mobster Ellsworth Raymond "Bumpy" Jonas in the first two Shaft movies, Booker T. Washington in the 1981 movie Ragtime, a performance which won him an NAACP Image Award, and as Cairon, the Childlike Empress's imperial physician, in the 1984 film The NeverEnding Story. He was nominated for an Emmy Award in 1977 for his role in the television mini-series Roots. He also co-starred with Avery Brooks on the television series A Man Called Hawk. Gunn appeared in six episodes as atheist shop owner Carl Dixon on Good Times, as boxer-turned-farmer Joe Kagan on Little House on the Prairie, and as "Moses Gage" in Father Murphy. In 1989, Gunn appeared in two episodes of The Cosby Show as two different characters. His final acting role was as murder suspect Risley Tucker in "Three Men and Adena", an episode of Homicide: Life on the Street.

Personal life and demise
Gunn married Gwendolyn Mumma Landes in 1966, becoming stepfather to her daughter Kirsten Sarah Landes. In 1970, they had a son, Justin, who became a musician and composer in the Copenhagen-based band, The Reverend Shine Snake Oil Co.

Gunn died from complications of asthma in Guilford, Connecticut on December 16, 1993, aged 64.

Film / Television

1964: Nothing But a Man as Mill Hand
1968: What's So Bad About Feeling Good? (uncredited)
1970: Carter's Army (TV Movie) as Private Doc Hayes
1970: WUSA as Clotho
1970: The Great White Hope as Scipio
1971: Wild Rovers as Ben
1971: Shaft as Bumpy Jonas
1971: Hawaii Five-O (TV Series) as Willy Stone
1972: Eagle in a Cage as General Gourgaud
1972: The Hot Rock as Dr. Amusa
1972: Shaft's Big Score as Bumpy Jonas
1972: Haunts of the Very Rich (TV Movie) as Seacrist
1973: Kung Fu (TV Series) as Isaac Montoya
1973: The Iceman Cometh as Joe Mott
1974: Amazing Grace as Welton J. Waters
1975: The Jeffersons (TV Series) as Monk Davis
1975: Cornbread, Earl and Me as Benjamin Blackwell
1975: Rollerball as Cletus
1975: Movin' On (TV Series) as Otis Andrews
1975: Aaron Loves Angela as Ike
1975: The Secret of the Pond (Disney TV Movie) as Sharbee
1977: Good Times (TV Series) as Carl Dixon
1977: Roots (TV Mini-Series) as Kintango
1977-1981: Little House on the Prairie (TV Series) as Joe Kagan
1977: Quincy M.E. (TV Series) as Ben McDade
1978: Remember My Name (1978) as Pike
1978: Vega$ (TV Series) as Domo
1980: The Ninth Configuration as Major Nammack
1981: Ragtime as Booker T. Washington
1982: Amityville II: The Possession as Detective Turner
1984: The NeverEnding Story as Cairon
1984: Firestarter as Dr. Herman Pynchot
1985: Certain Fury (1985) as Dr. Lewis Freeman
1985: Highway to Heaven (TV Series) as Ted Tilley
1986: Heartbreak Ridge as Staff Sergeant Webster
1987: Bates Motel (TV Movie) as Henry Watson
1987: Leonard Part 6 as Giorgio Francozzi
1988: Dixie Lanes as Isaac
1989: The Luckiest Man in the World (voice)
1989: A Man Called Hawk (TV Series) as "Old Man"
1989: Amen (TV Series) as Benjamin Tillman
1989: The Cosby Show (TV Series) as Joe Kendall / Dr. Lotus
1989: The Women of Brewster Place (TV Series) as Ben 
1990: Tales From The Crypt (TV Series) as Uncle Ezra
1991: Perfect Harmony (TV Movie) as Zeke
1991: Brother Future (TV Movie) as Isaac
1993-1996: Homicide: Life on the Street (TV Series) as Risley Tucker (final appearance)

References

External links

1929 births
1993 deaths
Tennessee State University alumni
University of Kansas alumni
American male film actors
American male stage actors
United States Army soldiers
Male actors from St. Louis
Deaths from asthma
African-American male actors
American male television actors
20th-century American male actors
Obie Award recipients
20th-century African-American people